The 1996 Korean League Cup, also known as the Adidas Cup 1996, was the sixth competition of the Korean League Cup.

Table

Matches

Awards

Source:

See also
1996 in South Korean football
1996 K League
1996 Korean FA Cup

References

External links
Official website
RSSSF

1996
1996
1996 domestic association football cups
1996 in South Korean sport